Early general elections were held in Trinidad and Tobago on 10 December 2001, after the ruling United National Congress lost its majority in the House of Representatives following four defections. However, the election results saw the UNC and the People's National Movement both win 18 seats. Although the UNC received the most votes, President A. N. R. Robinson nominated PNM leader Patrick Manning as Prime Minister. Voter turnout was 66.1%.

Results

References

Trinidad
Elections in Trinidad and Tobago
2001 in Trinidad and Tobago
December 2001 events in North America